The Taromenane are an uncontacted people living in Yasuni National Park, at the Ecuadorian Amazon Basin.

Together with the Tagaeri they make up the two last known indigenous groups living in voluntary isolation in Ecuador. The clan is believed to be distantly related to the Huaorani people.

It is estimated there are 150–300 Taromenane still maintaining a nomadic lifestyle in the rainforest, and perhaps only 20–30 surviving Tagaeri, although these numbers are uncertain.

The Taromenane has recently been under threat from oil developments and illegal logging in the Yasuni National Park. In February 2008, authorities in Ecuador agreed to investigate reports that five tribespeople belonging to the Taromenane and Tagaeri tribes had been killed by illegal loggers.

References

External links
 Yasuni Rainforest News 
 Ecuador Bars Oil Extraction, Logging from Indigenous Zone 
 Uncontacted: A field study of the Huaorani and their still uncontacted neighbors the Taromenane 

Indigenous peoples in Ecuador
Huaorani
Uncontacted peoples